Guillenia lasiophylla is a species of mustard plant known by the common names California mustard and slenderpod jewelflower. It is native to western North America from British Columbia to northern Mexico. It can be found in a variety of habitats such as desert flats, gravelly areas, limestone rocks, talus slopes, sandy banks, and grassy fields. This is a thin-stemmed erect annual herb with long lobed, toothed leaves surrounding the base of the plant and smaller leaves lining the stem. The top of the plant is occupied by an inflorescence of flowers, each with widely spaced oval-shaped white or yellowish petals half a centimeter long. The fruit is a flat, narrow silique up to 7 centimeters long which hangs downward from the stem. Flowers bloom March to June.

References

External links
Jepson Manual Treatment
USDA Plants Profile
Photo gallery

Brassicaceae